Carpatolechia yangyangensis is a moth of the family Gelechiidae. It is found in Korea, Japan and China (Jilin).

The wingspan is 12–15 mm. The species can be distinguished by the well-developed scale tufts on the forewings, a central yellowish patch, as well as a distinct yellowish white patch on the costa beyond the postmedian band. Adults are on wing in July, probably in one generation per year.

References

Moths described in 1992
Carpatolechia
Moths of Asia